Greek Peak Mountain Resort is a mountain resort located near Cortland, NY. Greek Peak offers day and night skiing, 7 days a week, and weather permitting, Greek Peak typically opens for skiing Thanksgiving weekend and closes in early April. For 2021-22, the mountain had 51 ski and 18 bike trails (many used for skiing too) with varied terrain. It has terrain from the 40-degree Olympian to nice beginner runs like Castor and Karyatis Way. It has 6 chair-lifts and 3 magic carpet lifts, one of which is used for tubing. A cross country Nordic center features 10 trails. Several terrain parks with various elements are also located on the mountain along with the Progression Park, which is more suited for people just starting out in the parks. Greek Peak offers lessons for all ages and every level of skier or boarder. There is babysitting available for non-skiing infants and toddlers as well. Greek Peak is also the home of the ski team Greek Peak Ski Club (GPSC) and hosts NASTAR Racing.

Summer activities include hiking, an outdoor adventure center with a zip line, a mountain coaster and mountain and off-road biking on trails of varied difficulty.

Greek Peak was founded in 1958 by members of the Cortland Ski Club. New York's Governor, William Averell Harriman, who developed Idaho's famous Sun Valley resort and ski mountain, conducted the Opening Day ceremonies for the new ski resort. By 1960, two T-Bars had been built and construction had begun on a new lodge. In 1962, Al Kryger was commissioned to build the first chairlift in central New York.   

Greek Peak led the industry by developing the idea of offering packages to local schools and colleges. The ski school runs programs for home school children as well as many schools and colleges from around the region.   

Beginning in the mid 1970s Greek Peak has had an Adaptive Snowsports (GPAS) program. It began in 1974 when the ski school director, Gordon Richardson, began teaching a person with a disability.

In the fall of 2009, the ski area opened Hope Lake Lodge. This includes a 106-unit fractional ownership condo and hotel,  Waterfalls Spa, and  Cascades indoor water park.  

For 2022-23, Greek Peak is replacing the 50 year old single speed double "Alpha" chairlift on the beginner slope with a multi-speed triple, adding additional snow making capacity, a new terrain off Chairs 4 and 5, and expanded glade skiing. Greek owners spent over $1.3 million for snow-making and lift upgrades. The new trails will increase the number of ski trails to 54 for the 2022-23 season.  Other recent improvements over the past few years have been a new RV park and wedding and event centers.

Trails

Easier 

 Platonic
 Meadows
 Alpha Slope
 Poseidon
 Ligo
 Lambi
 Karyatis Way
 Epicurus Way
 Castor
 Marathon
 Crisaean Way
 Arcadian Way

More Difficult 

 Arcadian Gate
 Mars Hill
 Trojan
 Upper Pollux
 Middle Pollux
 Keres
 Thantos
 Calypso
 Elysian Fields
 Wendy's Way
 Lower Atlas
 Cristy's Run
 Stoic
 Lower Zeus

Most Difficult 

 Alsos Glade
 Zeus
 Hercules
 Labyrinth
 Atlas
 Upper Freebird
 Lower Freebird
 Aesop's Glade
 Trident
 Lower Trident
 Alcmene
 Down & Dirty
 Iliad
 Nemesis
 Odyssey
 Spartan
 Olympian

References

External links
 Official website

Ski areas and resorts in New York (state)
Buildings and structures in Cortland County, New York
Tourist attractions in Cortland County, New York
1958 establishments in New York (state)